Nojor was an Indian Bengali supernatural television series that premiered on 18 March 2019, airing on Star Jalsha and streaming on Hotstar. The series is a remake of Nazar, which airs on StarPlus. The show stars Sampurna Lahiri, of Tara Ami Chokhe Dekhini fame, who is making a comeback with Nojor after 10 years and it stars her in a negative role. The show also stars actress Diya Mukherjee and actor John Bhattacharya in lead roles and Antara Pakira Nandi in a pivotal role. The series follows the Singha Roy family and the various struggles they face under the evil eye of a daini named Maya. It was ended due to low TRP ratings.

Plot

The plot is about an evil entity called Maaya who is a daini and bewitches the Singha Roy family, and the struggles the family experience under her nojor.
The story revolves around Maya, a 200 year old life-force sucking vampire-like creature called daini who also uses "jaadu tona" (witchcraft). Maaya kills people to steal their age (vitality) which keeps her young and beautiful. She enchants and captivate Dev Singha Roy by her surreal beauty, after which they marry and have two children, Ayush and Ananya. Maya wins Dev's favour by helping him a mass great wealth through black magic while she gradually drains his vitality that leads to his premature death. Maaya also kills Dev's mother to hide her secret identity but the Singha Roy grow suspicious anyway. A worried Debashree Sigha Roy tells of her fears to her friend Shivani (Ishani's mother), a psychical wizardess and a Reevaavanshii (monster-hunter) who comes to help Dev's bedevilled family and ward off the evil eye. She cuts Maya's plait rendering her powerless, Maya then escapes into the woods, but they pursue her along with a mob of villagers holding torches. Once cornered, Maya was set on fire which turns her into stone. Yet Maya's evil eye (nojor) still lurks on the family as she is a unique and very powerful daini called "Akaayan". Debashree and Singha Roy (her husband) adopt Dev's children Ayush and Ananya.

18 years later 
Ayush and Ananya grow up with their cousins Riddhi and Disha and go to a college in a city, far from the village of Sundar pur. Ayush discovers his superpowers, but is unaware that he is a "Daanush" (the hybrid offspring of a daini and a human). He can be saved from turning to the dark side only by a girl who has the "Devi-Maa" Durga's symbol as her birthmark, and is referred to as the Doibik (divine conduit). Ishani, has the symbol of the Devi-Maa behind her neck. Sparks fly between Ayush and Ishani though they didn't see each other. Ishani who is in search of her lost mother, comes across her father, Akhilesh, who is a professor and a "Revaavanshi" (member of a clan of monster-hunters) and her sister 'Indu'. Maya sends a puppet daayan, Tina with a fake Durga symbol to marry Ayush, So that Maya can return and also to keep the family from knowing the real doibik. Ayush and Debrashree come under Tina's control during which Tina and Ayush get married while the rest of the family is spellbound and cast into a deep sleep. The marriage releases Maaya from the charms and spells that imprisoned her. The Signa Roy family reunites with Maaya, and Ayush learns about his real mother. Vashkor, Ishani's childhood friend and obsessive lover, attempts to marry Ishani by taking advantage of his unwell mother, a visually challenged priestess, Guru Maa, who raised Ishani after Shivani's disappearance. Fearing Ayush's budding romance with Ishani, and the growing ties and bonds of the Singharay with Ishani, Maya sends a message summoning an asur named "Kalantakasur" from "Paathaal-Lohk" to scare Ishani away. Kalantakasur gets enraged on Maya for cutting his daughter Tina's plait. To Maya's horror, Kalantakasur was goring and pounding Ayush not Ishani, Ayush fought back with his Daanush superstrengths without success. A distressed Ishani invokes the Devi-Maa for help, who swiftly heeds to her plea. Ishani enters a tranced religious dance (Thaandov) and manifests her Doibik form complete with Durga's attire, multiple arms and s. Initially, the beast seemed invincible despite multiple strikes, but after Maya tells Ishani the demon's achilles heel, she smites him dead with her trishul. Everyone witness the battle and learn that Ishani is the real Doibik.Maya plots again to separate the family from Ishani, she reveals to Ishani that she has trapped her mother Shivani in the form of a bird and threatens to kill Shivani if Ishani doesn't marry Vashkor, but Ayush interferes and stops the marriage again . Later, Ayush learns about his Daanush self. Maya proves herself as Deboshree's half sister by merging her magical plait with Deboshree's plait which shocks all and frightens Sathi. A few days later, Vashkor gains the abilities of a daayan by wearing Tina's cut-off plait and terrorises the Singha Roy family all night to get Maya's plait, but Deboshree revitalises a temporarily weakened Maya by letting daylight into the room at dawn, and saves the whole family. The Singharoy face new challenges after Indu is hypnotised by Maya, and releases Rhimjhim a petni (evil spirit) to hatch a new conspiracy to separate Ishani and Ayush. Rhimjhim makes a "Bhasyachakra" (hex) to capture Ishani and Ayush but Ishani saves Ayush and finds herself trapped inside Rhimjhim's hex. Later at home, Ayush notices Ishani's unusual behaviour and recognize her to be Rhimjhim. He makes Rhimjhim dance in joy with Maya's help due to which Rhimjhim's "Bhasyachakra" breaks, freeing Ishani.Maya agrees for Ayush and Ishanis marriage and frees Shivani, who is later revealed to be "Sorpini" (naagin) and eventually kills her before which Shivani transfers her serpentine powers to Ishani.Ayush and Ishani get married. Later Ishani learns about Maya's real motive of wanting to feed on Ayush on the day of "Rakt-Chandra Grahan" or (Red Moon eclipse) to become immortal. Ishani falls into an Indefinite sleep and enters "Trishanku-Lok" (dimension between the living and the dead). With the Daivik gone, Ayush turns to the dark side and becomes an extremely powerful  who cares for himself but no one else. However Ishani returns with the help of a "Trinetra-mani" (a gem powered by Shiva's third eye), and brings Ayush back from the darkness. Finally, Ishani exposes Maya bad intentions to Singha Roy's after which Ayush expels Maya from their flat. Later Ishani and Ayush consummate. Enter Dola, Maya's twin sister and Tina's mother, a "Dukaayan" (two-headed daayan) who rules the "Swapna-Lohk" (dream world) unleashes horror. Tina denies to help Dola and hence the latter enters the real world through a "sleep portal", she frightens the singharoy and threatens to kill Ayush. With Akhilesh's help, the Singharoy attack Dola using "Makarketh" flowers on the muhurta of Makar Sankranti killing her in the process, however Dola is revived by Maya. The sisters fool Ishani into transferring her serpentine powers to Ayush. Believing that Ishani is devoid of powers, the sisters take advantage of the opportunity and try to burn her alive using a special fuel called "Tharal-agni". Ishani invokes Devi-Maa for help, who sends her vaahan to rescue Ishani, She quickly assumes her  form to slay the daayans. Maya and Dola are turned into stone statues however they are freed by Tina to regain her powers. A "Sarp" (snake-man) hypnotises Ayush and steals his Sarpika powers. He disguises himself as Ayush and targets Ishani's Trinetra-mani gem. Ayush and Ishani combine their powers and defeat the Sarp. To Maya's horror, She feeds on the serpent disguised as Ayush during the muhurta of "Red-moon eclipse" but having eaten a snake, Maya becomes a "Sarpayini" possessing combined powers. Dola shows Maya's horoscope which predicts that Ayush's child will put an end to her. The Singharoy celebrate Ishani's pregnancy. Ayush  learns about Maya's intentions to kill Ishani and their unborn child. Realising the danger he poses, Ayush decides to separate from Ishani till the baby is born. With heavy hearts, Ayush and Ishani part ways for the sake of their baby.

6 months later

Ishani gives birth to baby boy in an abandoned Shiva Temple. The Singharoy and Akhilesh come to see the newborn and affectionately call him "Gopal". Maya tries to kill Gopal several times, but in vain. Maya creates a "Vetaal-Mritkee Chakra" a cursed zone, whoever dies inside it becomes a "Vetaal-Mritkee" (zombie). Maya's unwittingly risks her life, the Mritkees attack and overpower her. Ishani and ayush managed to escape from vetaal mritkees and Maya shocked to see the powers of Gopal.While returning to their home with Ishani and her new born baby Gopal, The Jamini Daini attacks Riddhi for which the Singharoys suspect Riddhi's odd behaviour.
After which Tina discovered that she is a Jamini Daini and she attaches Maya's plait to Debashree's plait and she turns into a daini but doesn't realises.

Few Days Later

Debashree starts becoming evil and more evil becomes fond of heavy jewellery and things that a daini appreciates. Ishani grows suspicious about Debashree's changed behaviour and finds out that she has become a daini. Debashree successfully converts Ishani into a daayan, but the daini's power cannot overpower the divine powers within her. Ishani succeeds in convincing Debashree about the kindness within her. Debashree removes her daini plait and throws it into the same river where Maya's ashes were thrown before. However, Maya is revived & threatened to be taken back to Kohra-Lohk, the graveyard of all evil powers and realises that only a Doibik can save her. Maya blackmails Ishani to help her for gopal's safety.  Afraid Ishani agrees with her & must help her in return. Kuheli, the queen of Kohra-Lohk poisons the Singhas and upon realising her mistake, she gives the Kusharani's dagger to Ayush which has the power to push a person back to their past life. Ayush stabs his family and himself but later the all family members revived by Devi-Maa. Finally all members of the family reunite happily.

Cast

Main
Sampurna Lahiri as Maya Singha Roy, a 250-year-old most powerful daini, referred to as Ekaain, who is Ayush and Ananya's biological mother, Dev's wife, Debashree's half-sister and Dola's childhood friend and enemy. She is extremely powerful and cunning.(Main Antagonist) (Deceased)
Diya Mukherjee as Ishani Singha Roy, Akhilesh and Shibani's first daughter, Indrani's elder sister, Ayush's wife and Gopal's mother. She is the Doibik (divine conduit) who has a Goddess Durga's birthmark as she is blessed by Goddess Durga with powers to put an end to evil entities. She becomes a Sorpini after Shivani's untimely death to continue the Sorpini legacy. 
John Bhattacharya as Ayush Singha Roy, Maya and Dev's biological son, Biswarup and Debashree's adopted son, Ishani's husband and Gopal's father. He is a Daanush (the hybrid offspring of a daini and a human) with superpowers.

Recurring
Antara Nandy as Debashree Singha Roy, Biswarup's wife, Ayush and Ananya's adoptive mother and Maya's half-sister. Later, she becomes a daini after Tina attach Maya's braid with her hair but she succeed to be freed from this with the help of Ayush and Ishani. 
Royshreemaa Das as Tina Singha Roy, Maya's puppet daini / Sorpini and Ayush's ex-wife.  (Antagonist) (Deceased)
Sanchari Mondal as Tina Singha Roy (in disguise)/ Jaamini (a Kind of daini but invisible) (Deceased) (Antagonist)
Debdut Ghosh as Biswarup Singha Roy, Debashree's husband, Ayush and Ananya's adoptive father, Dev and Abhirup's elder brother.
Fahim Mirza as ACP Abhirup Singha Roy/Abhi, Ayush's uncle, Sati's husband, Riddhi and Disha's father, Biswarup and Dev's younger brother.(Antagonist)
Somashri Bhattacharya / Moumi Dutta as Ananya Singha Roy aka Anu, Ayush's younger sister, Dev and Maya's biological daughter, Biswarup and Debashree's adopted daughter.
Shampa Banerjee as Swati Singha Roy, Abhirup's wife, Riddhi and Disha's mother and Ayush's aunt.
Debarshi Banerjee as Riddhi Singha Roy, Abhirup and Sati's son, Disha's younger brother, Ayush and Ananya's cousin brother.
Nishantika Das as Disha Singha Roy, Abhirup and Sati's daughter, Riddhi's elder sister, Ayush and Ananya's cousin sister.
Dhrubojyoti Sarkar as Dev Singha Roy, Maya's husband, Ayush and Ananya's biological father, Biswarup's younger brother and Abhirup's elder brother. He was killed by his wife Maya.(Deceased)
Sagnik Chatterjee as Professor Akhilesh Chowdhury, Ishani and Indrani's father, Shivani's husband and a Reebaboongshi.
Sujata Dawn as Shibani Chowdhury, Akhilesh's wife, Ishani and Indrani's mother and the most efficient Reebabongshi who held Maya captive for 12 years. She was a Sorpini (naagin) who later gave her powers to Ishani to continue the Sorpini legacy. She was also Maya's best friend turned enemy after her son was killed by Maya.(Antagonist) (Deceased)
Rupsha Mondal as Indrani Chowdhury aka Indu, Akhilesh and Shibani's second daughter, Ishani's younger sister and a Reebabongshi 
Tanuka Chatterjee as Guru Maa, a visually challenged priestess and Bhaskar's mother who raised Ishani after Shivani's disappearance.
Satyam Bhattacharya / Suhotra Mukherjee as Bhaskar Chatterjee, Guru Maa's son and Ishani's ex-fiancé. He becomes a Daini-human hybrid called Chele-Daini using Tina's cut-off plait, and Dusorpa with Lobongolatika where Tina's spirit takes over his body.(Easential Antagonist)
Shirsha Guha Thakurta as Rimjhim, a powerful and foolish Petni and Maya's rival who falls in love with Ayush.(Deceased) (Antagonist)
Animesh Bhaduri as Gurudeb, Singha Roy's family priest and an acquaintance of Akhilesh, Indrani and Guru Maa.
Sudipta Banerjee as Dola Chatterjee, the Dikain (two-headed daini), Maya's childhood friend and enemy, Tina's mother.(Deceased)

References

External links
 
  at Hotstar

2019 Indian television series debuts
2019 Indian television series endings
Indian horror fiction television series
Indian supernatural television series
Bengali-language television programming in India
Indian drama television series
Star Jalsha original programming
2010s television soap operas
2010s Indian television series